The Argentine National Historical Museum is located in Buenos Aires, Argentina, and is a museum dedicated to the history of Argentina, exhibiting objects relating to the May Revolution and the Argentine War of Independence.

History
The institution was established as the Museo Histórico de la Capital (Historical Museum of the Capital) by Mayor Francisco Seeber on May 24, 1889.

The museum resulted from a proposal by historian Adolfo Carranza, who was designated director of the museum upon its inauguration on February 15, 1891. The museum was initially located on government property located at 3951 Santa Fe Avenue (now occupied by the Buenos Aires Botanical Garden). It was relocated to its present location in the San Telmo ward after the land's purchase by the Municipality of Buenos Aires in 1897. The land later occupied by the Botanical Garden was thus transferred to the municipal government, and the museum to the national government.

The mansion was originally built for the American businessman Charles Ridgley Horne in 1846. Allied to the paramount Governor of Buenos Aires, Juan Manuel de Rosas, Ridgley Horne was forced into exile after the strongman's 1852 overthrow, and the land was sold to José Gregorio Lezama. Following his 1894 death, his widow, Ángela Álzaga de Lezama sold the property to the city, which converted the mansion into the museum, and most of the surrounding land into Lezama Park.

Exhibits 
The museum houses over 50,000 items. Portions of the collection were gathered from donations of relatives of important figures in the May Revolution and the wars of independence. Other objects were part of the collection of the Public Museum (Museo Público) created in 1822 by Bernardino Rivadavia.

Its displays include regalia, belongings, furnishings and documents belonging to José de San Martín, María de los Remedios de Escalada, Manuel Belgrano, William Carr Beresford, Juan Manuel de Rosas, Bartolomé Mitre, Juan and Eva Perón, and other Argentine, as well as foreign, statesmen, lawmakers, and military figures who played key roles in the nation's history up to 1950.

Its collection of history paintings includes works by Esteban Echeverría, Cándido López, and Prilidiano Pueyrredón, among others.

Gallery Building

Gallery Collection

Gallery of Paintings

References

External links

Virtual visit
Official website 

 
Historical Museum
Museums in Buenos Aires
History museums in Argentina
Houses completed in 1846
Museums established in 1889
1889 establishments in Argentina